Arvind Krishna is an Indian-American business executive serving as the Chairman and CEO of IBM. He has been the CEO of IBM since April 2020 and took on the role of Chairman in January 2021. Krishna began his career at IBM in 1990, at IBM's Thomas J. Watson Research Center, and was promoted to Senior Vice President in 2015, managing IBM Cloud & Cognitive Software and IBM Research divisions. He was a principal architect of the acquisition of Red Hat, the largest acquisition in the company’s history.

Early life 
Krishna was born into a Telugu-speaking family in West Godavari District in the Coastal Andhra region of Andhra Pradesh, India. His father, Major General Vinod Krishna, was an army officer who served in the Indian Army and his mother, Aarathi Krishna, worked for the welfare of Army widows.

Education 
He did his schooling at Stanes Anglo Indian Higher Secondary School, Coonoor, Tamil Nadu and at St Joseph's Academy, Dehradun before receiving a BTech degree in electrical engineering from Indian Institute of Technology, Kanpur in 1985. He subsequently moved to the United States to earn a PhD in electrical engineering from the University of Illinois at Urbana–Champaign in 1991. He is the recipient of distinguished alumni awards from both IIT Kanpur and the University of Illinois Urbana–Champaign.

Career

Professional career 
Krishna joined IBM in 1990, at IBM's Thomas J. Watson Research Center, and continued in Watson Research for 18 years till 2009. Next he held General Manager role in Information management software and systems and technology group of IBM. In 2015, he was promoted to senior vice president of IBM Research. He later became senior vice president of IBM's cloud, and cognitive software division.

He also led the building and expansion of new markets for IBM in artificial intelligence, cloud, quantum computing, and blockchain technology. He was a driving force behind IBM's $34 billion acquisition of Red Hat, which closed in July 2019.

He was appointed IBM's CEO in January 2020, effective April 6, 2020, succeeding Ginni Rometty, who had served as CEO since 2012. He joined Satya Nadella, Shantanu Narayen, and Sundar Pichai as an Indian-American CEO of a major United States technology company. In 2021, he was named by CRN as the year's "Most Influential Executive".

Research 
He has co-authored dozens of patents, has been the editor of IEEE and ACM journals, and has published extensively in technical journals.

See also 
 Indians in the New York City metropolitan area

References

External links 
 
Arvind Krishna – Forbes

1962 births
IBM employees
American computer businesspeople
21st-century American businesspeople
20th-century American businesspeople
American electrical engineers
American chief executives
American technology chief executives
American chief executives of Fortune 500 companies
IBM people
Living people
Telugu people
Engineers from Andhra Pradesh
Indian emigrants to the United States
IIT Kanpur alumni
Grainger College of Engineering alumni
People from Andhra Pradesh
American people of Telugu descent
Chief executives in the technology industry